Krauskopf is a surname, derived from the German nickname for one with curly hair (krus: "curly" or  "crinkled" + kopf: "head") Notable people with the name include:

Engelbert Krauskopf (1820–1881), German-American gunsmith and naturalist
Joan Krauskopf (born 1932), American law professor 
Joseph Krauskopf (1858–1923), American rabbi and author
Kelly Krauskopf, American basketball executive
Konrad Bates Krauskopf (1910–2003), American geologist
Nord Krauskopf (1922–1986), American businessman and NASCAR owner

References

German-language surnames